Darryl D'Bonneau is a Dance/House/R&B artist from Charleston, South Carolina.

Biography
Although he calls New York City home, D'Bonneau mostly spends his time living and traveling across Europe, where he had more success.  D'Bonneau's musical roots trace back to his days a child, singing in church choirs and gospel ensembles. He's also good friends with actor singer Lj ugarte.

His first Billboard Hot Dance Music/Club Play chart appearance came in 1996 with "Don't Turn Your Back On Me," which peaked at #35, followed by "I Found Love," which peaked at #34 in 1997.  In 2000 he teamed up with Barbara Tucker to record "Stop Playing With My Mind."  The club classic would give him his first and only #1 on the aforementioned chart.

See also
List of number-one dance hits (United States)
List of artists who reached number one on the US Dance chart

External links
 Website

American rhythm and blues musicians
American dance musicians
American house musicians
Year of birth missing (living people)
Living people
Musicians from Charleston, South Carolina